The CECAFA U-17 Championship is a football tournament organized by CECAFA. Held annually, it includes national under 17 teams from East and Central Africa.

Past winners

|}
1: The tournament was to be hosted in 2008 but CECAFA could not raise enough money so the tournament was delayed a year.

References

CECAFA competitions